Saint Jawarjius Church and Monastery (Greek: Εκκλησία και Μοναστήρι του Αγίου Γεωργίου) is an Oriental Orthodox church located in Acre, Israel. It dates back to the Crusaders period and is built on the ruins of a Byzantine church. The walls of the church were covered with carved wood.

To the east of the church, and five blocks away, there is another monastery built on the ruins of the Crusader buildings. The clergy in this monastery reside in the church because it is to the Bishop of Galilee for the Greek Orthodox. There is a list of marble monastery inscribed with the name of two British admirals who fell during the battles of Acre in 1799 and 1840.

References 

Georgius
Acre Georgius
Acre Georgius